Burgaw Historic District is a national historic district located at Burgaw, Pender County, North Carolina. The district encompasses 130 contributing buildings, 1 contributing structure, and 1 contributing object in the central business district and surrounding residential sections of Burgaw.  The district developed from the mid-19th to mid-20th century, and includes notable examples of Gothic Revival and Queen Anne style architecture. Located in the district are the separately listed Burgaw Depot and Pender County Courthouse.  Other notable contributing buildings include the M. M. Moore House (c. 1885), Murphy-Sasser House (c. 1907), Dr. H. B. Thomas House (c. 1910), Burton-Noel House (1917), Burgaw Presbyterian Church (c. 1880), Macedonia African Methodist Episcopal (AME) Church (c. 1885), Burgaw Methodist Church (1928), the Burgaw Baptist Church (1948), Bank of Pender (1907), Pender County Jail (1924), and R.H. Holland Motor Company Building (1924).

It was listed on the National Register of Historic Places in 1999.

References

Historic districts on the National Register of Historic Places in North Carolina
Gothic Revival architecture in North Carolina
Queen Anne architecture in North Carolina
Buildings and structures in Pender County, North Carolina
National Register of Historic Places in Pender County, North Carolina